Franz is a surname of German origin. Notable persons with this name include:

 Agnes Franz (1794–1843), German writer
 Anselm Franz (1900–1994), Austrian engineer
 Arthur Franz (1920–2006), American actor
 Dennis Franz (born 1944), American actor noted for NYPD Blue
 Eduard Franz (1902–1983), American actor
 Elizabeth Franz (born 1941), American actress
 Ellen Franz (1839–1923), German pianist and actress
 Friedrich Franz (1783–1860), Moravian physicist and mathematician
 Frederick William Franz (1893–1992), past president of the Jehovah's Witnesses
 Helmut Franz (1911–2002), German academic teacher and choral conductor
 Horst Franz (born 1940), German football manager
 John E. Franz (born 1929), American organic chemist
 Johnny Franz (1922–1977), UK record producer
 Katherine Franz (born 1972), American chemist
 Kurt Franz (1914–1998), German Nazi SS commandant of Treblinka extermination camp
 Ludwig Franz (1922–1990), German politician
 Marie-Louise von Franz (1915–1998), Swiss Jungian psychologist and scholar
 Maik Franz (born 1981), German footballer
 Mike Frantz (born 1986), German footballer
 Nolan Franz, American football player
 Raymond Franz (1922–2010), former Jehovah's Witness
 Robert Franz (1815–1892), German composer
 Rod Franz (1925–1999), American football player
 Ron Franz (born 1945), American professional basketball player
 Walter Franz (1911–1992), German theoretical physicist
 Wilhelm Franz (1913–1971), German audio engineer
 Wolfgang Franz (economist) (born 1944), German economist
 Wolfgang Franz (mathematician) (1905–1996), German mathematician

German-language surnames